Talib Nagar is a village in Jawan Sikandarpur Block, Aligarh District of Uttar Pradesh, India.

It is located at a distance of 15.6 km from Aligarh.

History
Talib Nagar was a jagir during British India. It was owned by Nawabs belonging to the dynasty of Lalkhani Badgujar, a Muslim Rajput community, styled as Nawab of Talibnagar.

Nawabs of Talib Nagar
 Kunwar Mohamed Lutaf Ali Khan Sahib 
 Nawab Abdul Samad Khan(1861-1943)

 Kunwar Abdul Sami Khan

Present status
The village has a couple of junior and high schools.

References

External links 

 Location of Talib Nagar

Villages in Aligarh district
Former zamindari estates in Uttar Pradesh